Oreolalax popei (Pope's lazy toad or Baoxing toothed toad) is a species of amphibian in the family Megophryidae. It is endemic to China where it is found in southern Gansu, southern Shaanxi, and central and northeastern Sichuan provinces.
Its natural habitats are temperate forests, subtropical moist lowland forests, moist montane forests, and rivers.
It is threatened by habitat loss.

References

popei
Amphibians of China
Endemic fauna of China
Amphibians described in 1947
Taxonomy articles created by Polbot